Chongqing hot pot, also known as spicy hot pot, is usually eaten at restaurants, but otherwise is similar to roadside malatang. Chongqing hot pot is similar to the dry stir-fried mala xiang guo (麻辣香锅) which is also eaten in restaurants.

The traditional way of preparing and eating this style of dish is to put the food in a hot pot, wait for the food to cook, and when the food is ready, dip the pieces in sesame oil and eat them. People choose various kinds of food to prepare in Chongqing hot pot, such as beef, pork, chicken, Chinese sausages, beef strips, pig blood, and duck intestine.

General recipes 
As one of the most spicy types of hot pot, Chongqing hot pot uses different ingredients when making the hot pot base. The spicy Chongqing hot pot base is mainly red chili oil, which is made with beef fat and different kinds of spices, such as bay leaf, clove, cinnamon and so on. Chili, beef tallow, garlic, bean paste and other seasonings are stir-fried and boiled for a long time to form Chongqing hotpot seasoning, which is used in Chongqing hotpot soup base.

History 
The history of Chongqing hot pot started in the 1920s in Jiangbei District in Chongqing. In the beginning, the peddlers who worked on the wharf at the time would buy beef tripe, clean and boil it, and then cut beef liver and stomach into small pieces, and place it all into a clay stove. The stove used an iron basin to divide the stove into different sections that separated ingredients with different taste. When the spicy and salty soup boiled, the laborers would begin to eat, each person choosing their own food and own area divided in the stove, so they only eat and pay for what they put in that division, which is cheaper. It was not until the 23rd year of the Republic of China that a small restaurant in Chongqing turned the hot pot into a high-grade dish; before that, there was no restaurant that served Chongqing hot pot.

Liuyishou Hotpot has opened 1,200 restaurants worldwide.

Culture of Chongqing hot pot 

Chongqing hot pot is not only a local delicacy, but also represents Chongqing's food culture. When eating the hot pot, families and friends gather together and surround the steaming hot pot, talking with each other, which is warm and harmonious. It is the perfect food choice for the traditional Chinese culture of reunion. In Chongqing, there were a total of 26,991 hot pot restaurants in 2019.

See also
 Chongqing noodles
 Hot pot
 Malatang
 Mala xiang guo

References

Chongqing cuisine
Spicy foods
Chinese soups and stews